Aaron Shure is an American television writer, director, and producer. He is known for his work on several comedy series, including The Office, Everybody Loves Raymond, Lucky Louie, George and Leo, and The New Adventures of Old Christine.

Shure was showrunner and executive producer for season 3 of the TBS comedy, People of Earth; that season was cancelled prior to production.

Career

Television 
Born in Colorado, Shure regularly performed as an underage regular at Comedy Works in Denver. He graduated from Colorado College with a degree in philosophy and later worked as a karaoke host, street performer, radio commentator and circus clown. After moving to Florida, Shure performed on the streets as a member of Streetmosphere, a character-based improv troupe at Disney-MGM Studios. He also developed skills in improvisational comedy at SAK Comedy Lab.

Shure began his career as a writer for the CBS series George and Leo, and then as a writer and executive producer for the classic CBS sitcom Everybody Loves Raymond for the next seven years. In that time, Shure received two Emmy Awards for Outstanding Comedy Series and five Emmy nominations. The show was named 30-Minute TV Program of the Year by the American Film Institute and recognized, along with The Office, as one of the 101 best written television series of all time by the Writers Guild of America, West.

He then moved on to writing and producing for Louis C.K.'s HBO series Lucky Louie, followed by The New Adventures of Old Christine. From 2008 to 2012, Shure was a writer and producer for the hit NBC sitcom The Office, where he earned three consecutive Emmy nominations and three consecutive WGA nominations for TV Comedy Series, plus an additional WGA TV Episodic Comedy nomination for his episode "WUPHF.com." He worked on 99 episodes of the series, but not all his ideas made it into the show: an episode about Michael Scott coming back to the office in a messianic mood after spending the night accidentally crucified to a garage door was never filmed, even though Shure pitched it repeatedly.

Following The Office, Shure wrote and produced for TV Land's Hot in Cleveland. He also created and directed the transmedia series Dirty Work, which won the Emmy Award for Outstanding Creative Achievement in Interactive Media, the first time ever the Television Academy had awarded a property created solely for an online audience.

Since 2016, he has written and produced for the TBS comedy series, People of Earth, whose executive producers also include Conan O'Brien and Greg Daniels.

Shure and Norman Lear co-wrote en episode of "Notes on Love" for Shondaland and Netflix.

Commentary 
Shure's radio commentary has aired on WBEZ and NPR and he once appeared on the Late Show with David Letterman during a "Stupid Human Tricks" segment. He has written political commentaries for The Huffington Post and mused about the trials of being an expectant father for Salon.

Personal life 
He lives in Los Angeles with his two children and actively supports Public Citizen, a non-partisan foundation which says it serves as the people's voice in the nation's capital.

Filmography

As producer

As writer

Awards

Primetime Emmy Awards

Writers Guild of America Awards

References

External links 
 
 The Office 'Two Weeks' Q&A with Aaron Shure at OfficeTally

Year of birth missing (living people)
Living people
American television writers
American male television writers
American television producers
People from Colorado
Colorado College alumni